Rinaldo d'Este (26 April 1655 – 26 October 1737) was Duke of Modena and Reggio from 1694 until his death, as well as a member of the House of Este. He was succeeded by his son.

Biography

Born at the Ducal Palace of Modena, he was the only son of the third marriage of Francesco I d'Este, Duke of Modena. His mother was Lucrezia Barberini, daughter of  Taddeo Barberini and Anna Colonna.

Created cardinal on 2 September 1686, he left the ecclesiastical career in 1694 to succeed his nephew Francesco II as duke. He married Princess Charlotte Felicitas of Brunswick-Lüneburg (1671–1710), eldest daughter of Johann Friedrich, Duke of Brunswick-Lüneburg and Benedicta Henrietta of the Palatinate. He hoped that this marriage to a German princess would provide him needed support from the various German royal houses, including the Habsburgs, who were connected to his wife by blood. 

Rinaldo married Charlotte in Modena on 11 February 1696. Rinaldo wanted to encourage relations between Modena and Brunswick, whose ruling house was the House of Hanover. The marriage was celebrated splendidly despite financial problems in Modena; the artist Marcantonio Franceschini was commissioned to paint a room, the Salone d'onore at the ducal palace in honour of the marriage.

Charlotte died at the Ducal Palace of Modena after giving birth to a daughter in September 1710. The child also died. She was buried at the Church of San Vincenzo in Modena. Her son succeeded as Duke of Modena in 1737.

His first move as duke was to reduce the price of the grain and to improve the conditions of life of the peasants.

At the outbreak of the War of Spanish Succession (1702) he declared neutrality, but this did not prevent the French troops from capturing Modena. The Duke was forced to flee to Bologna. In 1707, after a long siege in which Rinaldo took part, German troops ousted the French from his capital. In the resulting peace treaty, Rinaldo acquired the Duchy of Mirandola, but lost Comacchio. In 1721, he attempted to establish friendlier relationship with France by marrying his son Francesco with Charlotte Aglaé d'Orléans, the daughter of Philippe d'Orléans, Duke of Orléans, the Regent of France during the childhood of King Louis XV.  Charlotte Aglaé received an enormous dowry of 1.8 million livres, half of which was contributed in the name of the young king, Louis XV, on orders of the Regent. From her adopted country, Charlote Aglaé received a trousseau consisting of diamonds and portraits of her future husband. However, the marriage proved troublesome, mainly due to his new daughter-in-law's licentious behaviour. 

He also failed in an attempt to obtain the Duchy of Parma through the marriage of his daughter, Enrichetta, with Antonio Farnese, Duke of Parma. When the duke died without an heir, Elisabeth Farnese, the Queen of Spain, acquired the duchy for her son, Charles III of Spain, a member of the House of Bourbon. 

In 1733 the War of Polish Succession began. Rinaldo, though nominally neutral, sided secretly for Austria. Again French troops forced him to move to Bologna, but a peace in 1736 was again favourable for the Este, who obtained the county of Novellara and Bagnolo.

Rinaldo was succeeded by his son Francesco.

Issue
Benedetta Maria Ernesta d'Este (18 Aug 1697 – 16 September 1777), died unmarried and without issue.
Francesco d'Este (2 July 1698 – 22 February 1780), future Duke of Modena; married Charlotte Aglaé d'Orléans and had issue.
Amalia Giuseppina d'Este (28 Jul 1699 – 5 July 1778), married the Marquis of Villeneuf, had no issue.
Gian Federico d'Este (1 September 1700 – 24 April 1727), died unmarried and without issue.
Princess Enrichetta d'Este (27 May 1702 – 30 January 1777), married Antonio Farnese, Duke of Parma had no issue; married Leopold, Landgrave of Hesse-Darmstadt, grandson of Louis VI, Landgrave of Hesse-Darmstadt, had no issue.
Clemente d'Este (20 April 1708 – 23 April 1708), died in infancy.
X d'Este (September 1710), female, died at birth.

The duke also had an illegitimate son:

Rinaldo de Reggio, Chevalier de Reggio, married Félicité De Canapan, and had one son: François Marie, Chevalier de Reggio, who was the great-grandfather of Confederate General P. G. T. Beauregard.

References
Alessandro Cont, "Sono nato principe libero, tale voglio conservarmi”: Francesco II d’Este (1660-1694), “Memorie Scientifiche, Giuridiche, Letterarie”, Accademia Nazionale di Scienze Lettere e Arti di Modena, ser. 8, 12 (2009), 2, pp. 407–459, https://www.academia.edu/6412388/_Sono_nato_principe_libero_tale_voglio_conservarmi_Francesco_II_dEste_1660-1694_

Footnotes

Ancestry

External links

1655 births
1737 deaths
Rinaldo
Rinaldo
Rinaldo
Rinaldo
18th-century Italian cardinals
Knights of the Golden Fleece of Austria
17th-century Italian nobility